Henry George (1839–1897) was an American political economist.

Henry George may also refer to:
 Henry George Jr. (1862–1916), member of the United States House of Representatives
 Henry George (cyclist) (1891–1976), Belgian track cyclist
 Harry L. George (1849–1923), American collector of Native American artifacts

People with the given names
 Henry George Bohn (1796–1884), British publisher
 Henry George Bonavia Hunt (1847–1917), founder of the Trinity College of Music
 Henry George Carroll (1865–1939), Canadian politician, jurist and Lieutenant-Governor of Quebec
 Henry George Glyde (1906–1998), Canadian painter and art educator
 Henry George Kendall (1874–1965), English sea captain
 Henry George Lackner (1851–1925), Ontario doctor and political figure
 Henry George Lamond (1885–1969), Australian farmer and writer
 Henry George Lyons (1864–1944), British geologist
 Henry George Raverty (1825–1906), British Indian Army officer and linguist
 Henry George Smith (1852–1924), Australian chemist
 Henry George Ward (1797–1860), English diplomat and politician

See also
 George Henry (disambiguation)
 Henry St. George (disambiguation)